This list of birds of Maryland includes species credibly documented in the U.S. state of Maryland and accepted by the Maryland / District of Columbia Records Committee (MRC) of the Maryland Ornithological Society as of 2022. There are 456 species included in the official list. Eight additional species of questionable origin and two of exotic origin per the MRC are also included in this page. Of the 460 species, 121 are rare anywhere in the state, 64 are rare in some part of the state, six have been introduced to North America, two are extinct, and two have been extirpated.

This list is presented in the taxonomic sequence of the Check-list of North and Middle American Birds, 7th edition through the 62nd Supplement, published by the American Ornithological Society (AOS). Common and scientific names are also those of the Check-list, except that the common names of families are from the Clements taxonomy because the AOS list does not include them.

Unless otherwise noted, all species listed below are considered to occur regularly in Maryland as permanent residents, summer or winter visitors, or migrants. The following tags are used to annotate some species:

(R) Rare - "Reviewable if found anywhere in Maryland" per the MRC
(R*) Rare (limited area) - "Reviewable if found in certain specified ranges in Maryland" per the MRC
(QO) Questionable origin - "Accepted species that may or may not be wild or naturally occurring" per the MRC
(EO) Exotic origin - "Accepted species whose natural history precludes wild or natural occurrence" per the MRC
(I) Introduced - a species that has been introduced to North America by the actions of humans, either directly or indirectly
(Xt) Extinct - a recent species that no longer exists
(Xp) Extirpated wild - a natural or wild species which is no longer found in Maryland, but still exists elsewhere
(Xx) Extirpated exotic - a formerly established introduced species which no longer occurs in Maryland

Ducks, geese, and waterfowl

Order: AnseriformesFamily: Anatidae

The family Anatidae includes the ducks and most duck-like waterfowl, such as geese and swans. These birds are adapted to an aquatic existence with webbed feet, bills that are flattened to a greater or lesser extent, and feathers that are excellent at shedding water due to special oils. Forty-six confirmed species, two of questionable origin, and one of exotic origin have been recorded in Maryland.

Black-bellied whistling-duck, Dendrocygna autumnalis (R)
Fulvous whistling-duck, Dendrocygna bicolor (R)
Snow goose, Anser caerulescens
Ross's goose, Anser rossii
Greater white-fronted goose, Anser albifrons
Pink-footed goose, Anser brachyrhynchus (R)
Brant, Branta bernicla (R*)
Barnacle goose, Branta leucopsis (R)
Cackling goose, Branta hutchinsii
Canada goose, Branta canadensis
Mute swan, Cygnus olor (I)
Black swan, Cygnus atratus (EO) (not on the AOS Check-list; scientific name and placement are per Clements)
Trumpeter swan, Cygnus buccinator (Xp)
Tundra swan, Cygnus columbianus
Wood duck, Aix sponsa
Baikal teal, Sibirionetta formosa (QO)
Blue-winged teal, Spatula discors
Cinnamon teal, Spatula cyanoptera (R)
Northern shoveler, Spatula clypeata
Gadwall, Mareca strepera
Falcated duck, Mareca falcata (QO)
Eurasian wigeon, Mareca penelope
American wigeon, Mareca americana
Mallard, Anas platyrhynchos
Mottled duck, Anas fulvigula (R)
American black duck, Anas rubripes
Northern pintail, Anas acuta
Green-winged teal, Anas crecca
Canvasback, Aythya valisineria
Redhead, Aythya americana
Ring-necked duck, Aythya collaris
Tufted duck, Aythya fuligula (R)
Greater scaup, Aythya marila
Lesser scaup, Aythya affinis
King eider, Somateria spectabilis (R*)
Common eider, Somateria mollissima (R*)
Harlequin duck, Histrionicus histrionicus (R*)
Surf scoter, Melanitta perspicillata
White-winged scoter, Melanitta deglandi
Black scoter, Melanitta americana
Long-tailed duck, Clangula hyemalis
Bufflehead, Bucephala albeola
Common goldeneye, Bucephala clangula
Barrow's goldeneye, Bucephala clangula (R)
Hooded merganser, Lophodytes cucullatus
Common merganser, Mergus merganser
Red-breasted merganser, Mergus serrator
Masked duck, Nomonyx dominicus (R)
Ruddy duck, Oxyura jamaicensis

New World quail
Order: GalliformesFamily: Odontophoridae

The New World quails are small, plump terrestrial birds only distantly related to the Old World quails, but named for their similar appearance and habits. One confirmed species and one of questionable origin have been recorded in Maryland.

Northern bobwhite, Colinus virginianus
Callipepla species, Callipepla sp. (QO)

Pheasants, grouse, and allies

Order: GalliformesFamily: Phasianidae

Phasianidae consists of the pheasants and their allies. These are terrestrial species, variable in size but generally plump with broad relatively short wings. Many species are gamebirds or have been domesticated as a food source for humans. Turkeys have a distinctive fleshy wattle that hangs from the underside of the beak and a fleshy protuberance that hangs from the top of its beak called a snood. As with many galliform species, the female (the hen) is smaller and much less colorful than the male (the tom). Grouse inhabit temperate and subarctic regions of the Northern Hemisphere. In all of Maryland's species, males are polygamous and have elaborate courtship displays. These heavily built birds have legs feathered to the toes. Most species are year-round residents and do not migrate. Four species of Phasianidae have been recorded in Maryland.

Wild turkey, Meleagris gallopavo
Ruffed grouse, Bonasa umbellus (R*)
Greater prairie-chicken, Tympanuchus cupido (Xp)
Heath hen, T. c. cupido (Xt)
Ring-necked pheasant, Phasianus colchicus (I) (Xx)

Flamingoes
Order: PhoenicopteriformesFamily: Phoenicopteridae

Flamingoes are gregarious wading birds, usually  in height, found in both the Western and Eastern Hemispheres. Flamingos filter-feed on shellfish and algae. Their oddly shaped beaks are specially adapted to separate mud and silt from the food they consume and, uniquely, are used upside-down. One species has been recorded in Maryland.

American flamingo, Phoenicopterus ruber (R)

Grebes

Order: PodicipediformesFamily: Podicipedidae

Grebes are small to medium-large freshwater diving birds. They have lobed toes and are excellent swimmers and divers. However, they have their feet placed far back on the body, making them quite ungainly on land. Five species have been recorded in Maryland.

Pied-billed grebe, Podilymbus podiceps
Horned grebe, Podiceps auritus
Red-necked grebe, Podiceps grisegena
Eared grebe, Podiceps nigricollis
Western grebe, Aechmorphorus occidentalis (R)

Pigeons and doves

Order: ColumbiformesFamily: Columbidae

Pigeons and doves are stout-bodied birds with short necks and short slender bills with a fleshy cere. Seven species have been recorded in Maryland.

Rock pigeon, Columba livia (I)
Eurasian collared-dove, Streptopelia decaocto (R) (I)
Passenger pigeon, Ectopistes migratorius (Xt)
Inca dove, Columbina inca (R)
Common ground dove, Columbina passerina (R)
White-winged dove, Zenaida asiatica (R)
Mourning dove, Zenaida macroura

Cuckoos

Order: CuculiformesFamily: Cuculidae

The family Cuculidae includes cuckoos, roadrunners, and anis. These birds are of variable size with slender bodies, long tails, and strong legs. Three species have been recorded in Maryland.

Groove-billed ani, Crotophaga sulcirostris (R)
Yellow-billed cuckoo, Coccyzus americanus
Black-billed cuckoo, Coccyzus erythropthalmus

Nightjars and allies

Order: CaprimulgiformesFamily: Caprimulgidae

Nightjars are medium-sized nocturnal birds that usually nest on the ground. They have long wings, short legs, and very short bills. Most have small feet that are of little use for walking and long, pointed wings. Their soft plumage is cryptically colored to resemble bark or leaves. Three species have been recorded in Maryland.

Common nighthawk,  Chordeiles minor
Chuck-will's-widow, Antrostomus carolinensis
Eastern whip-poor-will, Antrostomus vociferus

Swifts
Order: ApodiformesFamily: Apodidae

The swifts are small birds which spend the majority of their lives flying. These birds have very short legs and never settle voluntarily on the ground, perching instead only on vertical surfaces. Many swifts have long swept-back wings which resemble a crescent or boomerang. One species has been recorded in Maryland.

Chimney swift, Chaetura pelagica

Hummingbirds

Order: ApodiformesFamily: Trochilidae

Hummingbirds are small birds capable of hovering in mid-air due to the rapid flapping of their wings. They are the only birds that can fly backwards. Seven species have been recorded in Maryland.

Mexican violetear, Colibri thalassinus (R)
Ruby-throated hummingbird, Archilochus colubris
Black-chinned hummingbird, Archilochus alexandri (R)
Anna's hummingbird, Calypte anna (R)
Calliope hummingbird, Selasphorus calliope (R)
Rufous hummingbird, Selasphorus rufus
Allen's hummingbird, Selasphorus sasin (R)

Rails, gallinules, and coots

Order: GruiformesFamily: Rallidae

Rallidae is a large family of small- to medium-sized birds that includes the rails, crakes, coots, and gallinules. The most typical family members occupy dense vegetation in damp environments near lakes, swamps, or rivers. In general they are shy and secretive birds, making them difficult to observe. Most species have strong legs and long toes that are well adapted to soft uneven surfaces. They tend to have short, rounded wings and to be weak fliers. Ten species have been recorded in Maryland.

Clapper rail, Rallus crepitans (R*)
King rail, Rallus elegans (R*)
Virginia rail, Rallus limicola
Corn crake, Crex crex (R)
Sora, Porzana carolina
Common gallinule, Gallinula galeata
American coot, Fulica americana
Purple gallinule, Porphyrio martinicus (R)
Yellow rail, Coturnicops noveboracensis (R)
Black rail, Laterallus jamaicensis (R*)

Limpkin
Order: GruiformesFamily: Aramidae

The Limpkin is a large bird in a monotypic family. It is similar in appearance to the rails, but skeletally it is closer to the cranes. It is found in marshes and gets its common name from its appearance of limping as it walks.

Limpkin, Aramus guarauna (R)

Cranes
Order: GruiformesFamily: Gruidae

Cranes are large, long-legged, and long-necked birds. Unlike the similar-looking but unrelated herons, cranes fly with necks outstretched, not pulled back. Most have elaborate and noisy courting displays or "dances". One species has been recorded in Maryland.

Sandhill crane, Antigone canadensis

Stilts and avocets
Order: CharadriiformesFamily: Recurvirostridae

Recurvirostridae is a family of large wading birds that includes the avocets and stilts. The avocets have long legs and long up-curved bills. The stilts have extremely long legs and long, thin, straight bills. Two species have been recorded in Maryland.

Black-necked stilt, Himantopus mexicanus (R*)
American avocet, Recurvirostra americana

Oystercatchers

Order: CharadriiformesFamily: Haematopodidae

The oystercatchers are large and noisy plover-like birds, with strong bills used for smashing or prying open molluscs. One species has been recorded in Maryland.

American oystercatcher, Haematopus palliatus (R*)

Plovers and lapwings
Order: CharadriiformesFamily: Charadriidae

The family Charadriidae includes the plovers, dotterels, and lapwings. They are small- to medium-sized birds with compact bodies, short thick necks, and long, usually pointed, wings. They are usually found in open country worldwide, mostly in habitats near water. Eight confirmed species and one of questionable origin have been recorded in Maryland.

Northern lapwing, Vanellus vanellus (R)
Southern lapwing, Vanellus chilensis (QO)
Black-bellied plover, Pluvialis squatarola
American golden-plover, Pluvialis dominica
Killdeer, Charadrius vociferus
Semipalmated plover, Charadrius semipalmatus
Piping plover, Charadrius melodus (R*)
Wilson's plover, Charadrius wilsonia (R)
Snowy plover, Charadrius nivosus (R)

Sandpipers and allies

Order: CharadriiformesFamily: Scolopacidae

Scolopacidae is a large diverse family of small- to medium-sized shorebirds, including the sandpipers, curlews, godwits, shanks, tattlers, woodcocks, snipes, dowitchers, and phalaropes. The majority of these species eat small invertebrates picked out of the mud or soil. Different lengths of legs and bills enable multiple species to feed in the same habitat, particularly on the coast, without direct competition for food. Thirty-six species have been recorded in Maryland.

Upland sandpiper, Bartramia longicauda
Whimbrel, Numenius phaeopus (R*)
Eskimo curlew, Numenius borealis (R) (X)
Long-billed curlew, Numenius americanus (R)
Hudsonian godwit, Limosa haemastica (R*)
Marbled godwit, Limosa fedoa (R*)
Ruddy turnstone, Arenaria interpres
Red knot, Calidris canutus (R*)
Ruff, Calidris pugnax (R*)
Sharp-tailed sandpiper, Calidris acuminata (R)
Stilt sandpiper, Calidris himantopus
Curlew sandpiper, Calidris ferruginea (R)
Red-necked stint, Calidris ruficollis (R)
Sanderling, Calidris alba
Dunlin, Calidris alpina
Purple sandpiper, Calidris maritima (R*)
Baird's sandpiper, Calidris bairdii
Little stint, Calidris minuta (R)
Least sandpiper, Calidris minutilla
White-rumped sandpiper, Calidris fuscicollis
Buff-breasted sandpiper, Calidris subruficollis
Pectoral sandpiper, Calidris melanotos
Semipalmated sandpiper, Calidris pusilla
Western sandpiper, Calidris mauri
Short-billed dowitcher, Limnodromus griseus
Long-billed dowitcher, Limnodromus scolopaceus (R*)
American woodcock, Scolopax minor
Wilson's snipe, Gallinago delicata
Spotted sandpiper, Actitis macularius
Solitary sandpiper, Tringa solitaria
Lesser yellowlegs, Tringa flavipes
Willet, Tringa semipalmata
Greater yellowlegs, Tringa melanoleuca
Wilson's phalarope, Phalaropus tricolor
Red-necked phalarope, Phalaropus lobatus
Red phalarope, Phalaropus fulicarius (R*)

Skuas and jaegers

Order: CharadriiformesFamily: Stercorariidae

The skuas and jaegers are in general medium to large birds, typically with gray or brown plumage, often with white markings on the wings. They have longish bills with hooked tips and webbed feet with sharp claws. They look like large dark gulls, but have a fleshy cere above the upper mandible. They are strong, acrobatic fliers. Five species have been recorded in Maryland.

Great skua, Stercorarius skua (R)
South polar skua, Stercorarius maccormicki (R)
Pomarine jaeger, Stercorarius pomarinus (R*)
Parasitic jaeger, Stercorarius parasiticus (R*)
Long-tailed jaeger, Stercorarius longicaudus (R)

Auks, murres, and puffins
Order: CharadriiformesFamily: Alcidae

Alcids are superficially similar to penguins due to their black-and-white colors, their upright posture, and some of their habits; however, they are only distantly related to the penguins and are able to fly. Auks live on the open sea, only deliberately coming ashore to nest. Six species have been recorded in Maryland.

Dovekie, Alle alle (R*)
Common murre, Uria aalge (R*)
Thick-billed murre, Uria lomvia (R)
Razorbill, Alca torda (R*)
Black guillemot, Cepphus columba (R)
Atlantic puffin, Fratercula arctica (R*)

Gulls, terns, and skimmers

Order: CharadriiformesFamily: Laridae

Gulls are typically medium-to-large birds, usually gray or white, often with black markings on the head or wings. They have stout, longish bills and webbed feet. The large species take up to four years to attain full adult plumage, but two years is typical for small gulls. Terns are in general medium-to-large birds, typically with gray or white plumage, often with black markings on the head. They have longish bills and webbed feet. They are lighter bodied and more streamlined than gulls, and look elegant in flight with long tails and long narrow wings. Skimmers are tropical and subtropical species. They have an elongated lower mandible. They feed by flying low over the water surface with the lower mandible skimming the water for small fish. Thirty-two confirmed species of Laridae, and one species of questionable origin, have been recorded in Maryland.

Black-legged kittiwake, Rissa tridactyla (R*)
Sabine's gull, Xema sabini (R)
Bonaparte's gull, Chroicocephalus philadelphia
Black-headed gull, Chroicocephalus ridibundus (R*)
Little gull, Hydrocoloeus minutus (R*)
Silver gull, Chroicocephalus novaehollandiae (QO) (not on the AOS Check-list; scientific name and placement are per Clements)
Ross's gull, Rhodostethia rosea (R)
Laughing gull, Leucophaeus atricilla (R*)
Franklin's gull, Leucophaeus pipixcan (R)
Black-tailed gull, Larus crassirostris (R)
Common gull, Larus canus (R)
Ring-billed gull, Larus delawarensis
California gull, Larus californicus (R)
Herring gull, Larus argentatus
Yellow-legged gull, Larus michahellis (R)
Iceland gull, Larus glaucoides (R*)
Lesser black-backed gull, Larus fuscus
Glaucous gull, Larus hyperboreus (R*)
Great black-backed gull, Larus marinus (R*)
Kelp gull, Larus dominicanus (R)
Sooty tern, Onychoprion fuscatus (R*)
Bridled tern, Onychoprion anaethetus (R*)
Least tern, Sternula antillarum (R*)
Gull-billed tern, Gelochelidon nilotica (R*)
Caspian tern, Hydroprogne caspia
Black tern, Chlidonias niger
Roseate tern, Sterna dougallii (R)
Common tern, Sterna hirundo
Arctic tern, Sterna paradisaea (R)
Forster's tern, Sterna forsteri
Royal tern, Thalasseus maximus (R*)
Sandwich tern, Thalasseus sandvicensis (R*)
Black skimmer, Rynchops niger (R*)

Tropicbirds
Order: PhaethontiformesFamily: Phaethontidae

Tropicbirds are slender white birds of tropical oceans with exceptionally long central tail feathers. Their long wings have black markings, as does the head.  Two species have been recorded in Maryland.

White-tailed tropicbird, Phaethon lepturus (R)
Red-billed tropicbird, Phaethon aethereus (R)

Loons

Order: GaviiformesFamily: Gaviidae

Loons are aquatic birds that are the size of a large duck, to which they are unrelated. Their plumage is largely gray or black, and they have spear-shaped bills. Loons swim well and fly adequately, but, because their legs are placed towards the rear of the body, are extremely poor at walking. Three species have been recorded in Maryland.

Red-throated loon, Gavia stellata
Pacific loon, Gavia pacifica (R)
Common loon, Gavia immer

Albatrosses
Order: ProcellariiformesFamily: Diomedeidae

The albatrosses are among the largest of flying birds, and the great albatrosses from the genus Diomedea have the largest wingspans of any extant birds. One species has been recorded in Maryland.

Yellow-nosed albatross, Thalassarche chlororhynchos (R)

Southern storm-petrels

Order: ProcellariiformesFamily: Oceanitidae

The storm-petrels are the smallest seabirds, relatives of the petrels, feeding on planktonic crustaceans and small fish picked from the surface, typically while hovering. The flight is fluttering and sometimes bat-like. Until 2018, this family's three species were included with the other storm-petrels in family Hydrobatidae. Two species have been recorded in Maryland.

Wilson's storm-petrel, Oceanites oceanicus (R*)
White-faced storm-petrel, Pelagodroma marina (R)

Northern storm-petrels

Order: ProcellariiformesFamily: Hydrobatidae

Though the members of this family are similar in many respects to the southern storm-petrels, including their general appearance and habits, there are enough genetic differences to warrant their placement in a separate family. Two species have been recorded in Maryland.

Leach's storm-petrel, Hydrobates leucorhous (R*)
Band-rumped storm-petrel, Hydrobates castro (R)

Shearwaters and petrels

Order: ProcellariiformesFamily: Procellariidae

The procellariids are the main group of medium-sized "true petrels", characterized by united nostrils with medium septum and a long outer functional primary. Eight species and a species pair have been recorded in Maryland.

Northern fulmar, Fulmarus glacialis (R*)
Trindade petrel, Pterodroma arminjoniana (R)
Black-capped petrel, Pterodroma hasitata (R)
Zino's petrel/Fea's petrel, Pterodroma madeira/Pterodroma feae (R)
Cory's shearwater, Calonectris diomedea (R*)
Sooty shearwater, Ardenna griseus (R*)
Great shearwater, Ardenna gravis (R*)
Manx shearwater, Puffinus puffinus (R*)
Audubon's shearwater, Puffinus lherminieri (R*)

Storks
Order: CiconiiformesFamily: Ciconiidae

Storks are large, heavy, long-legged, long-necked wading birds with long stout bills and wide wingspans. They lack the powder down that other wading birds such as herons, spoonbills and ibises use to clean off fish slime. Storks lack a pharynx and are mute. One species has been recorded in Maryland.

Wood stork, Mycteria americana (R)

Frigatebirds
Order: SuliformesFamily: Fregatidae

Frigatebirds are large seabirds usually found over tropical oceans. They are large, black, or black-and-white, with long wings and deeply forked tails. The males have colored inflatable throat pouches. They do not swim or walk and cannot take off from a flat surface. Having the largest wingspan-to-body-weight ratio of any bird, they are essentially aerial, able to stay aloft for more than a week. One species has been recorded in Maryland.

Magnificent frigatebird, Fregata magnificens (R)

Boobies and gannets
Order: SuliformesFamily: Sulidae

The sulids comprise the gannets and boobies. Both groups are medium-large coastal seabirds that plunge-dive for fish. Three species have been recorded in Maryland.

Masked booby, Sula dactylatra (R)
Brown booby, Sula leucogaster (R)
Northern gannet, Morus bassanus (R*)

Anhingas

Order: SuliformesFamily: Anhingidae

Darters and anhingas are cormorant-like water birds with long necks and long, straight beaks. They are fish eaters which often swim with only their neck above the water. One species has been recorded in Maryland.

Anhinga, Anhinga anhinga

Cormorants and shags
Order: SuliformesFamily: Phalacrocoracidae

Cormorants are medium-to-large aquatic birds, usually with mainly dark plumage and areas of colored skin on the face. The bill is long, thin, and sharply hooked. Their feet are four-toed and webbed. Three species have been recorded in Maryland.

Great cormorant, Phalacrocorax carbo (R*)
Double-crested cormorant, Nannopterum auritum
Neotropic cormorant, Nannopterum brasilianum (R)

Pelicans

Order: PelecaniformesFamily: Pelecanidae

Pelicans are large water birds with a distinctive pouch under their beak. Like other birds in the order Pelecaniformes, they have four webbed toes. Two species have been recorded in Maryland.

American white pelican, Pelecanus erythrorhynchos
Brown pelican, Pelecanus occidentalis (R*)

Herons, egrets, and bitterns

Order: PelecaniformesFamily: Ardeidae

The family Ardeidae contains the herons, egrets, and bitterns. Herons and egrets are medium to large wading birds with long necks and legs. Bitterns tend to be shorter-necked and more secretive. Members of Ardeidae fly with their necks retracted, unlike other long-necked birds such as storks, ibises, and spoonbills. Thirteen species have been recorded in Maryland.

American bittern, Botaurus lentiginosus
Least bittern, Ixobrychus exilis
Great blue heron, Ardea herodias
Great egret, Ardea alba
Snowy egret, Egretta thula
Little egret, Egretta garzetta (R)
Little blue heron, Egretta caerulea
Tricolored heron, Egretta tricolor (R*)
Reddish egret, Egretta rufescens (R)
Cattle egret, Bubulcus ibis
Green heron, Butorides virescens
Black-crowned night-heron, Nycticorax nycticorax
Yellow-crowned night-heron, Nyctanassa violacea

Ibises and spoonbills
Order: PelecaniformesFamily: Threskiornithidae

The family Threskiornithidae includes the ibises and spoonbills. They have long, broad wings. Their bodies tend to be elongated, the neck more so, with rather long legs. The bill is also long, decurved in the case of the ibises, straight and distinctively flattened in the spoonbills. Four species have been recorded in Maryland.

White ibis, Eudocimus albus
Glossy ibis, Plegadis falcinellus
White-faced ibis, Plegadis chihi (R*)
Roseate spoonbill, Platalea ajaja (R)

New World vultures

Order: CathartiformesFamily: Cathartidae

The New World vultures are not closely related to Old World vultures, but superficially resemble them because of convergent evolution. Like the Old World vultures, they are scavengers. However, unlike Old World vultures, which find carcasses by sight, New World vultures have a good sense of smell with which they locate carcasses. Two species have been recorded in Maryland.

Black vulture, Coragyps atratus
Turkey vulture, Cathartes aura

Osprey
Order: AccipitriformesFamily: Pandionidae

The Osprey is a medium-large fish-eating bird of prey or raptor. It is widely distributed because it tolerates a wide variety of habitats, nesting in any location that is near a body of water and provides an adequate food supply. It is the only member of its family.

Osprey, Pandion haliaetus

Hawks, eagles, and kites

Order: AccipitriformesFamily: Accipitridae

Accipitridae is a family of birds of prey which includes hawks, eagles, kites, harriers, and Old World vultures. These birds have large powerful hooked beaks for tearing flesh from their prey, strong legs, powerful talons, and keen eyesight. Fifteen species have been recorded in Maryland.

White-tailed kite, Elanus leucurus (R)
Swallow-tailed kite, Elanoides forficatus
Golden eagle, Aquila chrysaetos
Northern harrier, Circus hudsonius
Sharp-shinned hawk, Accipiter striatus
Cooper's hawk, Accipiter cooperii
Northern goshawk, Accipiter gentilis (R)
Bald eagle, Haliaeetus leucocephalus
Mississippi kite, Ictinia mississippiensis
Red-shouldered hawk, Buteo lineatus
Broad-winged hawk, Buteo platypterus
Swainson's hawk, Buteo swainsoni (R)
Red-tailed hawk, Buteo jamaicensis
Rough-legged hawk, Buteo lagopus
Zone-tailed hawk, Buteo albonotatus (R)

Barn-owls
Order: StrigiformesFamily: Tytonidae

Barn-owls are medium to large owls with large heads and characteristic heart-shaped faces. They have long strong legs with powerful talons. One species has been recorded in Maryland.

Barn owl, Tyto alba

Owls

Order: StrigiformesFamily: Strigidae

The typical owls are small-to-large solitary nocturnal birds of prey. They have large forward-facing eyes and ears, a hawk-like beak, and a conspicuous circle of feathers around each eye called a facial disk. Eight species have been recorded in Maryland.

Eastern screech-owl, Megascops asio
Great horned owl, Bubo virginianus
Snowy owl, Bubo scandiacus
Burrowing owl, Athene cunicularia (R)
Barred owl, Strix varia
Long-eared owl, Asio otus
Short-eared owl, Asio flammeus
Northern saw-whet owl, Aegolius acadicus

Kingfishers
Order: CoraciiformesFamily: Alcedinidae

Kingfishers are medium-sized birds with large heads, long, pointed bills, short legs, and stubby tails. One species has been recorded in Maryland.

Belted kingfisher, Megaceryle alcyon

Woodpeckers

Order: PiciformesFamily: Picidae

Woodpeckers are small- to medium-sized birds with chisel-like beaks, short legs, stiff tails, and long tongues used for capturing insects. Some species have feet with two toes pointing forward and two backward, while several species have only three toes. Many woodpeckers have the habit of tapping noisily on tree trunks with their beaks. Eight species have been recorded in Maryland.

Red-headed woodpecker, Melanerpes erythrocephalus
Red-bellied woodpecker, Melanerpes carolinus
Yellow-bellied sapsucker, Sphyrapicus varius
Downy woodpecker, Dryobates pubescens
Red-cockaded woodpecker, Dryobates borealis (R)
Hairy woodpecker, Dryobates villosus
Northern flicker, Colaptes auratus
Pileated woodpecker, Dryocopus pileatus

Falcons and caracaras
Order: FalconiformesFamily: Falconidae

Falconidae is a family of diurnal birds of prey, notably the falcons and caracaras. They differ from hawks, eagles, and kites in that they kill with their beaks instead of their talons. Five species have been recorded in Maryland.

Crested caracara, Caracara plancus (R)
American kestrel, Falco sparverius
Merlin, Falco columbarius
Gyrfalcon, Falco rusticolus (R)
Peregrine falcon, Falco peregrinus

New World and African parrots
Order: PsittaciformesFamily: Psittacidae

Parrots are small-to-large birds with a characteristic curved beak. Their upper mandibles have slight mobility in the joint with the skull and they have a generally erect stance. All parrots are zygodactyl, having the four toes on each foot placed two at the front and two to the back. Most of the more than 150 species in this family are found in the New World. Two species have been recorded in Maryland.

Carolina parakeet, Conuropsis carolinensis (Xt)
Monk parakeet, Myiopsitta monachus (QO)

Tyrant flycatchers

Order: PasseriformesFamily: Tyrannidae

Tyrant flycatchers are passerine birds which occur throughout North and South America. They superficially resemble the Old World flycatchers, but are more robust and have stronger bills. They do not have the sophisticated vocal capabilities of the songbirds. Most, but not all, are rather plain in plumage. As the name implies, most are insectivorous. Twenty-one species and a species pair have been recorded in Maryland.

Ash-throated flycatcher, Myiarchus cinerascens (R)
Great crested flycatcher, Myiarchus crinitus
Tropical kingbird, Tyrannus melancholicus (R)
Couch's kingbird, Tyrannus couchii (R)
Western kingbird, Tyrannus verticalis
Eastern kingbird, Tyrannus tyrannus
Gray kingbird, Tyrannus dominicensis (R)
Scissor-tailed flycatcher, Tyrannus forficatus (R)
Fork-tailed flycatcher, Tyrannus savana (R)
Olive-sided flycatcher, Contopus cooperi
Eastern wood-pewee, Contopus virens
Yellow-bellied flycatcher, Empidonax flaviventris
Acadian flycatcher, Empidonax virescens
Alder flycatcher, Empidonax alnorum
Willow flycatcher, Empidonax traillii
Least flycatcher, Empidonax minimus
Hammond's flycatcher, Empidonax hammondii (R)
Pacific-slope flycatcher/cordilleran flycatcher, Empidonax difficilis/Empidonax occidentalis (R)
Eastern phoebe, Sayornis phoebe
Say's phoebe, Sayornis saya (R)
Vermilion flycatcher, Pyrocephalus rubinus (R)

Vireos, shrike-babblers, and erpornis

Order: PasseriformesFamily: Vireonidae

The vireos are a group of small- to medium-sized passerine birds. They are typically greenish in color and resemble the wood-warblers, except for their heavier bills. Seven species have been recorded in Maryland.

White-eyed vireo, Vireo griseus
Bell's vireo, Vireo bellii (R)
Yellow-throated vireo, Vireo flavifrons
Blue-headed vireo, Vireo solitarius
Philadelphia vireo, Vireo philadelphicus
Warbling vireo, Vireo gilvus
Red-eyed vireo, Vireo olivaceus

Shrikes

Order: PasseriformesFamily: Laniidae

Shrikes are passerine birds known for their habit of catching other birds and small animals and impaling the uneaten portions of their bodies on thorns. A shrike's beak is hooked, like that of a typical bird of prey. Two species have been recorded in Maryland.

Loggerhead shrike, Lanius ludovicianus (R)
Northern shrike, Lanius borealis

Crows, jays, and magpies

Order: PasseriformesFamily: Corvidae

The family Corvidae includes crows, ravens, jays, choughs, magpies, treepies, nutcrackers, and ground jays. Corvids are above average in size among the Passeriformes, and some of the larger species show high levels of intelligence. Four species have been recorded in Maryland.

Blue jay, Cyanocitta cristata
American crow, Corvus brachyrhynchos
Fish crow, Corvus ossifragus
Common raven, Corvus corax (R*)

Tits, chickadees, and titmice

Order: PasseriformesFamily: Paridae

The Paridae are mainly small stocky woodland species with short stout bills. Some have crests. They are adaptable birds, with a mixed diet which includes seeds and insects. Five species have been recorded in Maryland.

Carolina chickadee, Poecile carolinensis (R*)
Black-capped chickadee, Poecile atricapilla (R*)
Boreal chickadee, Poecile hudsonica (R)
Tufted titmouse, Baeolophus bicolor
Great tit, Parus major (EO) (not on the AOS Check-list; scientific name and placement are per Clements)

Larks
Order: PasseriformesFamily: Alaudidae

Larks are small terrestrial birds with often extravagant songs and display flights. Most larks are fairly dull in appearance. They feed on insects and seeds. One species has been recorded in Maryland.

Horned lark, Eremophila alpestris

Swallows

Order: PasseriformesFamily: Hirundinidae

The family Hirundinidae is adapted to aerial feeding. They have a slender streamlined body, long pointed wings, and a short bill with a wide gape. The feet are adapted to perching rather than walking and the front toes are partially joined at the base. Seven species have been recorded in Maryland.

Bank swallow, Riparia riparia
Tree swallow, Tachycineta bicolor
Northern rough-winged swallow, Stelgidopteryx serripennis
Purple martin, Progne subis
Barn swallow, Hirundo rustica
Cliff swallow, Petrochelidon pyrrhonota
Cave swallow, Petrochelidon fulva

Kinglets
Order: PasseriformesFamily: Regulidae

The kinglets are a family of small insectivorous birds. The adults have colored crowns, giving rise to their name. Two species have been recorded in Maryland.

Ruby-crowned kinglet, Corthylio calendula
Golden-crowned kinglet, Regulus satrapa

Waxwings
Order: PasseriformesFamily: Bombycillidae

The waxwings are a group of birds with soft silky plumage and unique red tips to some of the wing feathers. In the Bohemian and cedar waxwings, these tips look like sealing wax and give the group its name. These are arboreal birds of northern forests. They live on insects in summer and berries in winter. Two species have been recorded in Maryland.

Bohemian waxwing, Bombycilla garrulus (R)
Cedar waxwing, Bombycilla cedrorum

Nuthatches

Order: PasseriformesFamily: Sittidae

Nuthatches are small woodland birds. They have the unusual ability to climb down trees head first, unlike other birds, which can only go upwards. Nuthatches have big heads, short tails, and powerful bills and feet. Three species have been recorded in Maryland.

Red-breasted nuthatch, Sitta canadensis
White-breasted nuthatch, Sitta carolinensis
Brown-headed nuthatch, Sitta pusilla (R*)

Treecreepers 
Order: PasseriformesFamily: Certhiidae

Treecreepers are small woodland birds with brown backs and white underparts. They have thin pointed down-curved bills, which they use to extricate insects from bark. They have stiff tail feathers, like woodpeckers, which they use to support themselves on vertical trees. One species has been recorded in Maryland.

Brown creeper, Certhia americana

Gnatcatchers
Order: PasseriformesFamily: Polioptilidae

These dainty birds resemble Old World warblers in their structure and habits, moving restlessly through foliage while seeking insects. The gnatcatchers are mainly a soft bluish gray in color and have the long sharp bill typical of an insectivore. Many species have distinctive black head patterns (especially males) and long, regularly cocked black-and-white tails. One species has been recorded in Maryland.

Blue-gray gnatcatcher, Polioptila caerulea

Wrens

Order: PasseriformesFamily: Troglodytidae

Wrens are small and inconspicuous birds, except for their loud songs. They have short wings and thin down-turned bills. Several species often hold their tails upright. All are insectivorous. Seven species have been recorded in Maryland.

Rock wren, Salpinctes obsoletus (R)
House wren, Troglodytes aedon
Winter wren, Troglodytes hiemalis
Sedge wren, Cistothorus platensis
Marsh wren, Cistothorus palustris
Carolina wren, Thryothorus ludovicianus
Bewick's wren, Thryomanes bewickii (R)

Mockingbirds and thrashers

Order: PasseriformesFamily: Mimidae

The mimids are a family of passerine birds which includes thrashers, mockingbirds, tremblers, and the New World catbirds. These birds are notable for their vocalization, especially their remarkable ability to mimic a wide variety of birds and other sounds heard outdoors. The species' appearance tends towards dull grays and browns in plumage. Four species have been recorded in Maryland.

Gray catbird, Dumetella carolinensis
Brown thrasher, Toxostoma rufum
Sage thrasher, Oreoscoptes montanus (R)
Northern mockingbird, Mimus polyglottos

Starlings

Order: PasseriformesFamily: Sturnidae

Starlings are small- to medium-sized Old World passerine birds with strong feet. Their flight is strong and direct and most are gregarious. Their preferred habitat is fairly open country, and they eat insects and fruit. The plumage of several species is dark with a metallic sheen. One species has been recorded in Maryland.

European starling, Sturnus vulgaris (I)

Thrushes and allies

Order: PasseriformesFamily: Turdidae

The thrushes are a group of passerine birds that inhabit mainly but not exclusively in the Old World. They are plump, soft plumaged, small- to medium-sized insectivores or sometimes omnivores, often feeding on the ground. Eleven species have been recorded in Maryland.

Eastern bluebird, Sialia sialis
Mountain bluebird, Sialia currucoides (R)
Townsend's solitaire, Myadestes townsendi (R)
Veery, Catharus fuscescens
Gray-cheeked thrush, Catharus minimus
Bicknell's thrush, Catharus bicknelli (R*)
Swainson's thrush, Catharus ustulatus 
Hermit thrush, Catharus guttatus
Wood thrush, Hylocichla mustelina
American robin, Turdus migratorius
Varied thrush, Ixoreus naevius (R)

Old World flycatchers
Order: PasseriformesFamily: Muscicapidae

The Old World flycatchers form a large family of small passerine birds. These are mainly small arboreal insectivores, many of which, as the name implies, take their prey on the wing. One species has been recorded in Maryland.

Northern wheatear, Oenanthe oenanthe (R)

Old World sparrows
Order: PasseriformesFamily: Passeridae

Old World sparrows are small passerine birds. In general, these sparrows tend to be small plump brownish or grayish birds with short tails and short powerful beaks. Sparrows are seed eaters, but they also consume small insects. One species has been recorded in Maryland.

House sparrow, Passer domesticus (I)

Wagtails and pipits
Order: PasseriformesFamily: Motacillidae

Motacillidae is a family of small passerine birds with medium to long tails. They include the wagtails, longclaws, and pipits. They are slender, ground-feeding insectivores of open country. One species has been recorded in Maryland.

American pipit, Anthus rubescens

Finches, euphonias, and allies

Order: PasseriformesFamily: Fringillidae

Finches are seed-eating passerine birds that are small to moderately large and have a strong beak, usually conical and in some species very large. All have twelve tail feathers and nine primaries. These birds have a bouncing flight with alternating bouts of flapping and gliding on closed wings, and most sing well. Ten confirmed species and two species of questionable origin have been recorded in Maryland.

Evening grosbeak, Coccothraustes vespertinus
Pine grosbeak, Pinicola enucleator (R)
House finch, Haemorhous mexicanus (native to the southwestern U.S.; introduced in the east)
Purple finch, Haemorhous purpureus
Common redpoll, Acanthis flammea
Hoary redpoll, Acanthis hornemanni (R)
European greenfinch, Chloris chloris (QO) (not on the AOS Check-list; scientific name and placement are per Clements)
Red crossbill, Loxia curvirostra
White-winged crossbill, Loxia leucoptera
European goldfinch, Carduelis tristis (QO)
Pine siskin, Spinus pinus
American goldfinch, Spinus tristis

Longspurs and snow buntings
Order: PasseriformesFamily: Calcariidae

The Calcariidae are a group of passerine birds that had been traditionally grouped with the New World sparrows, but differ in a number of respects and are usually found in open grassy areas. Four species have been recorded in Maryland.

Lapland longspur, Calcarius lapponicus
Chestnut-collared longspur, Calcarius ornatus (R)
Smith's longspur, Calcarius pictus (R)
Snow bunting, Plectrophenax nivalis

New World sparrows

Order: PasseriformesFamily: Passerellidae

Until 2017, these species were considered part of the family Emberizidae. Most of the species are known as sparrows, but these birds are not closely related to the Old World sparrows which are in the family Passeridae. Many of these have distinctive head patterns. Twenty-nine species have been recorded in Maryland.

Cassin's sparrow, Peucaea cassinii (R)
Bachman's sparrow, Peucaea aestivalis (R)
Grasshopper sparrow, Ammodramus savannarum
Lark sparrow, Chondestes grammacus
Lark bunting, Calamospiza melanocorys (R)
Chipping sparrow, Spizella passerina
Clay-colored sparrow, Spizella pallida
Field sparrow, Spizella pusilla
Fox sparrow, Passerella iliaca
American tree sparrow, Spizelloides arborea
Dark-eyed junco, Junco hyemalis
White-crowned sparrow, Zonotrichia leucophrys
Golden-crowned sparrow, Zonotrichia atricapilla (R)
Harris's sparrow, Zonotrichia querula (R)
White-throated sparrow, Zonotrichia albicollis
Vesper sparrow, Pooecetes gramineus
LeConte's sparrow, Ammospiza leconteii (R)
Seaside sparrow, Ammospiza maritima (R*)
Nelson's sparrow, Ammospiza nelsoni
Saltmarsh sparrow, Ammospiza caudacuta (R*)
Baird's sparrow, Centronyx bairdii (R)
Henslow's sparrow, Centronyx henslowii (R*)
Savannah sparrow, Passerculus sandwichensis
Song sparrow, Melospiza melodia
Lincoln's sparrow, Melospiza lincolnii
Swamp sparrow, Melospiza georgiana
Green-tailed towhee, Pipilo chlorurus (R)
Spotted towhee, Pipilo maculatus (R)
Eastern towhee, Pipilo erythrophthalmus

Yellow-breasted chat
Order: PasseriformesFamily: Icteriidae

This species was historically placed in the wood-warblers (Parulidae) but nonetheless most authorities were unsure if it belonged there. It was placed in its own family in 2017.

Yellow-breasted chat, Icteria virens

Troupials and allies

Order: PasseriformesFamily: Icteridae

The icterids are a group of small-to-medium, often colorful passerine birds restricted to the New World and include the grackles, New World blackbirds, and New World orioles. Most species have black as a predominant plumage color, often enlivened by yellow, orange, or red. Fourteen species have been recorded in Maryland.

Yellow-headed blackbird, Xanthocephalus xanthocephalus (R*)
Bobolink, Dolichonyx oryzivorus
Eastern meadowlark, Sturnella magna
Western meadowlark, Sturnella neglecta (R)
Orchard oriole, Icterus spurius
Bullock's oriole, Icterus bullockii (R)
Baltimore oriole, Icterus galbula
Red-winged blackbird, Agelaius phoeniceus
Shiny cowbird, Molothrus bonariensis (R)
Brown-headed cowbird, Molothrus ater
Rusty blackbird, Euphagus carolinus
Brewer's blackbird, Euphagus cyanocephalus (R)
Common grackle, Quiscalus quiscula
Boat-tailed grackle, Quiscalus major (R*)

New World warblers

Order: PasseriformesFamily: Parulidae

The wood-warblers are a group of small, often colorful passerine birds restricted to the New World. Most are arboreal, but some are more terrestrial, such as the Ovenbird. Most members of this family are insectivores. Forty-one species have been recorded in Maryland.

Ovenbird, Seiurus aurocapilla
Worm-eating warbler, Helmitheros vermivorum
Louisiana waterthrush, Parkesia motacilla
Northern waterthrush, Parkesia noveboracensis
Golden-winged warbler, Vermivora chrysoptera
Blue-winged warbler, Vermivora cyanoptera
Black-and-white warbler, Mniotilta varia
Prothonotary warbler, Protonotaria citrea
Swainson's warbler, Limnothlypis swainsonii (R)
Tennessee warbler, Leiothlypis peregrina
Orange-crowned warbler, Leiothlypis celata
Nashville warbler, Leiothlypis ruficapilla
Virginia's warbler, Leiothlypis virginiae (R)
Connecticut warbler, Oporornis agilis
Mourning warbler, Geothlypis philadelphia
Kentucky warbler, Geothlypis formosa
Common yellowthroat, Geothlypis trichas
Hooded warbler, Setophaga citrina
American redstart, Setophaga ruticilla
Cape May warbler, Setophaga tigrina
Cerulean warbler, Setophaga cerulea
Northern parula, Setophaga americana
Magnolia warbler, Setophaga magnolia
Bay-breasted warbler, Setophaga castanea
Blackburnian warbler, Setophaga fusca
Yellow warbler, Setophaga petechia
Chestnut-sided warbler, Setophaga pensylvanica
Blackpoll warbler, Setophaga striata
Black-throated blue warbler, Setophaga caerulescens
Palm warbler, Setophaga palmarum
Pine warbler, Setophaga pinus
Yellow-rumped warbler, Setophaga coronata
Yellow-throated warbler, Setophaga dominica
Prairie warbler, Setophaga discolor
Black-throated gray warbler, Setophaga nigrescens (R)
Kirtland's warbler, Setophaga kirtlandii (R)
Townsend's warbler, Setophaga townsendi (R)
Hermit warbler, Setophaga occidentalis (R)
Black-throated green warbler, Setophaga virens
Canada warbler, Cardellina canadensis
Wilson's warbler, Cardellina pusilla

Cardinals and allies

Order: PasseriformesFamily: Cardinalidae

The Cardinals are a family of robust, seed-eating birds with strong bills. They typically live in open woodland. The sexes usually have distinct plumages. Eleven species have been recorded in Maryland.

Summer tanager, Piranga rubra (R*)
Scarlet tanager, Piranga olivacea
Western tanager, Piranga ludoviciana (R)
Northern cardinal, Cardinalis cardinalis
Rose-breasted grosbeak, Pheucticus ludovicianus
Black-headed grosbeak, Pheucticus melanocephalus (R)
Blue grosbeak, Passerina caerulea
Lazuli bunting, Passerina amoena (R)
Indigo bunting, Passerina cyanea
Painted bunting, Passerina ciris (R*)
Dickcissel, Spiza americana

See also
List of birds
Lists of birds by region
List of North American birds

References

External links
 Maryland Ornithological Society web site
 Recent Maryland bird sightings
 RedKnot.org links to shorebird recovery sites, movies, events & other info on red knot rufa & horseshoe crabs.

Birds
Maryland